Mayoral elections were held in the Turkish province of Ankara as part of nationwide local elections on 31 March 2019. A total of 26 mayors, one for each of the 25 districts of Ankara and one for the Ankara Metropolitan Municipality, were elected.

Initial results suggested that opposition candidate Mansur Yavaş was elected with 50% of the vote, compared to the government candidate Mehmet Özhaseki's 47%. Although the AKP challenged the results and forced recounts in several districts, they were unable to overturn Yavaş's majority. Yavaş's victory was confirmed on 8 April 2019, when he was officially inaugurated mayor.

Candidates
On 27 November 2018, the ruling Justice and Development Party (AKP) announced their metropolitan mayoral candidate to be Mehmet Özhaseki, the former mayor of Kayseri and former Minister of Environment and Urban Planning. Due to the People's Alliance agreement, Özhaseki has the support of the Nationalist Movement Party (MHP).

On 18 December, the main opposition Republican People's Party (CHP) announced their candidate to be Mansur Yavaş, their candidate in the previous election in 2014. Yavaş had narrowly lost the previous election to AKP candidate Melih Gökçek despite accusations of widespread electoral fraud, with many commentators arguing that Yavaş was the true winner of the election. Yavaş has the support of the Good Party and declared himself to be the 'Nation Alliance candidate'.

Opinion polling

Results

Metropolitan municipality mayoral election

Overall result

Results by district

District municipality mayoral elections

Akyurt

Altındağ

Ayaş

Bala

Beypazarı

Çamlıdere

Çankaya

Çubuk

Elmadağ

Etimesgut

Evren

Gölbaşı

Güdül

Haymana

Kahramankazan

Kalecik

Keçiören

Kızılcahamam

Mamak

Nallıhan

Polatlı

Pursaklar

Sincan

Şereflikoçhisar

Yenimahalle

References

Ankara
2010s in Ankara
Ankara